Alexander Bower (fl. 1804–1830) was a biographer from Scotland.

Bower began as a teacher in Edinburgh, then acted as assistant-librarian in the university of Edinburgh. He died suddenly about 1830–1.

He published several works between 1804 and 1830:
 An Account of the Life of James Beattie, LL.D., 1804, 8vo., besides his subject, James Beattie, are occasional notes on contemporary literature and literary figures in Scotland.
 The Life of Luther, with an account of the early progress of the Reformation, 1813, 8vo.
 The History of the University of Edinburgh, chiefly compiled from original Papers and Records never before published, vols. i. ii., 1817, vol. iii. 1830, 8vo. noted as a biographical source for people associated with the university, but other details are lacking in value.
 The Edinburgh Students' Guide, or an Account of the Classes of the University, 1822.

References

Scottish biographers
1830s deaths
Year of birth unknown
People associated with the University of Edinburgh